Anti-flash gear, also known simply as flash gear, is basic personal protective equipment consisting of a fire-resistant hood and fire-resistant gloves, often made of Nomex.

The purpose of anti-flash gear is to provide protection to the head, neck, face and hands from short-duration flame exposure and heat.  This equipment is donned by shipboard navy personnel whenever a fire breaks out or during periods of heightened readiness.

History
Anti-flash gear was introduced in the Royal Navy following the Battle of Jutland, when a number of British warships had been destroyed or damaged by flash from burning cordite propellant passing through the shell handling room into the magazine. It was found that the anti-flash hoods and gloves were more effective if flame-proofed with borax or boric acid.

References

External links

 
 

Protective gear